Konstanty Skirmunt (30 August 1866 – 24 July 1949) was a Polish politician.

During 1907—1914 he was a member of the State Council of the Russian Empire. He was a member of the Polish National Committee in Paris in 1917–1918, Polish ambassador in Rome in 1919–1921, Polish Minister of Foreign Affairs in 1921–22, and Polish ambassador in London in 1919–1934.

Decorations

1923: Order of Polonia Restituta of the 1st class ( Wielka wstęga orderu Odrodzenia Polski)
1926: Grand Cross of the Order of the White Lion (Czechoslovakia)
1932: Gold Cross of Merit
1936: Royal Victorian Order of the 1st class (Great Britain)

References

1866 births
1949 deaths
People from Ivanava District
People from Brestsky Uyezd
People from the Russian Empire of Polish descent
19th-century Polish nobility
Clan of Dąb
Ministers of Foreign Affairs of the Second Polish Republic
Members of the State Council (Russian Empire)
Members of the Polish National Committee (1914–1917)
Members of the Polish National Committee (1917–1919)
Ambassadors of Poland to the United Kingdom
Ambassadors of Poland to Italy
Grand Crosses of the Order of the White Lion
20th-century Polish nobility